Notable persons with the surname Deslongchamps include:

 Pierre Deslongchamps (born 1938), Canadian chemist
 Jean-Louis-Auguste Loiseleur-Deslongchamps (1774–1849), French physician and botanist
 Jacques Amand Eudes-Deslongchamps (1794–1867), French naturalist and paleontologist
 His son Eugène Eudes-Deslongchamps (1830–1889), also a naturalist and paleontologist